The Bowlers Rock Light was a lighthouse located in the Rappahannock River in Virginia, United States.

History

This spot was marked by lightships beginning in 1835. In 1861 the first lightship was destroyed by Confederate raiders, and a second ship replaced it in 1864, to be replaced with a screw-pile lighthouse in 1868. Although a square house was constructed, the foundation had six plies, the two extra being provided to protect the light from ice. In spite of this a report in 1895 remarked that the light had suffered such damage and was unlikely to survive. This prediction was fulfilled in 1918, when the light was destroyed. It was officially deactivated two years later. In 1921 a small caisson structure with an automated light replaced the lighthouse, and with variations in light source, continues in service to the present.

References

Bowlers Rock Light, from the Chesapeake Chapter of the United States Lighthouse Society

Lighthouses completed in 1868
Lighthouses in Virginia
Lighthouses in the Chesapeake Bay
1868 establishments in Virginia